
Kaga may refer to:

Places
 Kaga, Ishikawa, a city in Japan.
 Kaga Province, an old province of Japan, now part of Ishikawa prefecture.
 Kaga Domain, an old feudal domain (han) in Kaga Province
 Kaga, Nigeria, a Local Government Area in Borno State, Nigeria
 Kaga, Afghanistan, in Nangarhar province
 Kaga, a parish with a 12th-century church, just north-west of Linköping, Sweden
 , a village in the district of Beloretsk, in Bashkortostan, Russia
 , a river in Bashkortostan, Russia

People
 Kaga Takeshi, better known as Chairman Kaga of Iron Chef.
 Shouzou Kaga, a Japanese video game designer.

Other
 Japanese aircraft carrier Kaga, an aircraft carrier of the Imperial Japanese Navy, named after the province.
 JS Kaga (DDH-184), a helicopter carrier of the Japan Maritime Self-Defense Force, named after the province.
 KAGA-LP, a low-power radio station (106.9 FM) licensed to serve San Angelo, Texas, United States